is a Japanese manga series written and illustrated by Hiroumi Aoi. It was serialized in Square Enix's Gangan Joker from September 2016 to April 2021 and published in 11 volumes.

Publication
The series is written and illustrated by Hiroumi Aoi, and began serialization in Gangan Joker on September 21, 2016. In November 2019, it was revealed the series would enter its final arc after a one-month break. The series ended in Gangan Joker on April 22, 2021. The series individual chapters were collected into eleven tankōbon volumes.

At Anime NYC 2017, Yen Press announced they licensed the series for English publication.

Volume list

Reception
Katherine Dacey from The Manga Critic criticized the first volume for its characters and artwork. Manga artist Hiroya Oku recommended the series. At San Diego Comic-Con, Deb Aoki picked the series as the worst manga for anyone of any age.

References

External links
 

Gangan Comics manga
Horror anime and manga
Shōnen manga
Yen Press titles